The following is the list of cities in Kyrgyzstan that underwent a name change in the past.

Rybachye → Ysyk-Kel (1989) → Balykchy (1992)
Karakol → Przhevalsk (1889) → Karakol (1921) → Przhevalsk (1939) → Karakol (1991)
Pishpek → Frunze (1926) → Bishkek (1991)

See also
List of renamed cities in Kazakhstan
List of renamed cities in Tajikistan
List of renamed cities in Turkmenistan
List of renamed cities in Uzbekistan

Kyrgyzstan geography-related lists
Renamed, Kyrgyzstan
Kyrgyzstan, Renamed
 
Kyrgyzstan